The 1974 USLTA Indoor Circuit , also known by its sponsored name Schick Tennis Classic, was a professional tennis circuit held in the United States from January until April that year. It consisted of 13 tournaments and was organized by Bill Riordan and sanctioned by the United States Lawn Tennis Association (USLTA). The circuit offered total prize money of over $400,000 including a bonus pool of $100,000 available for the top eight players who participated in at least six tournaments.

Schedule

January

February

March

April

See also
 1974 Grand Prix circuit
 1974 World Championship Tennis circuit

References

External links
 1974 ATP tournament schedule

USLTA Indoor Circuit
USLTA Indoor Circuit
USLTA Indoor Circuit seasons